Benjamin J. Rhodes (born November 14, 1977) is an American writer, political commentator and former Deputy National Security Advisor for Strategic Communications and Speechwriting under President Barack Obama. With Jake Sullivan, he is the co-chair of National Security Action, a political NGO. He contributes to NBC News and MSNBC regularly as a political commentator. He is also a Crooked Media contributor, and co-host of the foreign policy podcast Pod Save the World.

Early life and education 
Rhodes was born on November 14, 1977, in the Upper East Side neighborhood of Manhattan. He is the son of an Episcopal father from Texas and a Jewish mother from New York. He attended the Collegiate School, graduating in 1996. Rhodes then attended Rice University, graduating Phi Beta Kappa in 2000 with majors in English and political science. He then moved back to New York, attending New York University and graduating in 2002 with an MFA in creative writing. His brother, David Rhodes, is a former president of CBS News.

Career 

In the summer of 1997, Rhodes volunteered with the Rudy Giuliani mayoral campaign. In the summer of 2001, he worked on the New York City Council campaign of Diana Reyna. In 2002, James Gibney, editor of Foreign Policy, introduced Rhodes to Lee Hamilton, former member of the House of Representatives and director of the Woodrow Wilson International Center for Scholars, who was looking for a speechwriter. Rhodes then spent five years as an assistant to Hamilton, helping to draft the Iraq Study Group Report and the recommendations of the 9/11 Commission.

In 2007, Rhodes began working as a speechwriter for the 2008 Obama presidential campaign.

Rhodes wrote Obama's 2009 Cairo speech "A New Beginning." Rhodes was the adviser who counseled Obama to withdraw support from Egyptian leader Hosni Mubarak, becoming a key adviser during the 2011 Arab Spring. Rhodes supported Israel in the 2012 Israel–Gaza conflict.

Rhodes was instrumental in the conversations that led to Obama reestablishing the United States' diplomatic relations with Cuba, which had been cut off since 1961. The New York Times reported that Rhodes spent "more than a year sneaking off to secret negotiations in Canada and finally at the Vatican" in advance of the official announcement in December 2014.

After leaving the Obama administration, Rhodes began working as a commentator. He began contributing to Crooked Media, NBC News and MSNBC. In 2018, he co-founded National Security Action.

In 2015-16, Rhodes defended U.S. political and military backing of Saudi Arabia's war in Yemen. He later criticized Trump administration's involvement in the Saudi Arabian-led intervention in Yemen. He wrote of the war in Yemen, "Looking back, I wonder what we might have done differently, particularly if we'd somehow known that Obama was going to be succeeded by a President Trump."

Rhodes said Obama's administration was too worried about offending Turkey. He said Obama should have recognized the Armenian genocide.

In 2018, Random House published Rhodes's memoir, The World as It Is, a behind-the-scenes account of Barack Obama's presidency. Rhodes has written opinion articles for newspapers and magazines including the New York Times and The Atlantic. Rhodes was featured in the HBO documentary The Final Year, along with John Kerry, Samantha Power and Susan Rice. The documentary portrays the events of Obama's final year in office, with a focus on his foreign policy team.

Opinion on Netanyahu government
In 2021, Rhodes, a liberal Zionist, stated that, in the course of dealing with the Israeli–Palestinian conflict, it became clear to the Obama administration that the Netanyahu government was not interested in working in earnest toward a peace treaty based on a two-state solution. He stated with respect to the U.S. government that, "nevertheless, we act like somehow Bibi Netanyahu believed in the two-state solution. We pretended to my shame at times in the Obama administration that he was interested in that. When I don't think he was, ever." Rhodes expressed concern that the Biden administration is making the same mistake.

Controversies 
In a controversial profile in The New York Times Magazine, Rhodes was quoted "deriding the D.C. press corps and boasting of how he created an 'echo chamber' to market the administration's foreign policy", including the international nuclear agreement with Iran. The piece was criticized by numerous journalism outlets for Rhodes' apparent flippancy and cynicism in "pushing a 'narrative to media to sell the Iran nuclear deal". Foreign Policy magazine, which had named Rhodes as one of the top 100 global thinkers the year before, wrote: 
Perhaps the key sentence is this: “His lack of conventional real-world experience of the kind that normally precedes responsibility for the fate of nations — like military or diplomatic service, or even a master’s degree in international relations, rather than creative writing — is still startling.”
But, as that quote indicates, he comes off like an overweening little schmuck.... I expect cynicism in Washington. But it usually is combined with a lot of knowledge... To be cynical and ignorant and to spin those two things into a virtue? That’s industrial-strength hubris.

Personal attack
In 2017, it was alleged that Israeli private intelligence agency Black Cube attempted to manufacture incriminating or embarrassing information about Rhodes and his wife, as well as about fellow former National Security Council staffer Colin Kahl, in an apparent effort to undermine supporters of the Iran nuclear deal. Rhodes said of the incident, "This just eviscerates any norm of how governments should operate or treat their predecessors and their families. It crosses a dangerous line." The effort continued well after the Obama administration ended.

Awards and honors 
In 2011, Rhodes was on Time magazine's "40 Under 40" list of powerful and prominent young professionals. Rhodes was number 13 on Fortune magazine's "40 Under 40" list of the most influential young people in business in 2014.

In 2015, Rhodes was named one of Foreign Policy magazine's top 100 global thinkers.

Books

Personal life
Rhodes is married to Ann Norris, who was chief foreign policy adviser to former U.S. Senator Barbara Boxer. They have two daughters.

References

External links 

 
 

Obama administration personnel
United States National Security Council staffers
American political consultants
MSNBC people
NBC News people
Collegiate School (New York) alumni
Rice University alumni
New York (state) Democrats
People from the Upper East Side
21st-century American Jews
1977 births
Living people
United States Deputy National Security Advisors